Peter Gideon (born December 29, 1987) is a Nigerian football forward currently playing for Nasarawa United F.C.

Career 
Gideon began his career by Enugu Rangers, in July 2008 signed than a contract with Nasarawa United F.C.

External links
 NUFC team page

1987 births
Living people
Igbo sportspeople
Nigerian footballers
Nasarawa United F.C. players
Association football forwards
Rangers International F.C. players